Jesse Goldstein  is a former Olympic level Judoka for the United States.  Jesse placed Bronze in the 1979 Judo National Championships at 95kg.

References

Year of birth missing (living people)
Living people
American judoka
Place of birth missing (living people)
Pan American Games medalists in judo
Pan American Games silver medalists for the United States
Judoka at the 1979 Pan American Games
Medalists at the 1979 Pan American Games